San Jose Earthquakes are an American soccer club founded in 1994 as the San Jose Clash after the city of San Jose was awarded an inaugural Major League Soccer (MLS) franchise. San Jose began playing competitive soccer in the 1996 season. It plays its home games at Avaya Stadium, competing in the Western Conference of the MLS. The current San Jose Earthquakes is the second soccer team from San Jose to bear the Earthquakes nickname. The tradition was started by San Jose's North American Soccer League team in 1974 who carried the name until the team folded in 1988. The current San Jose Earthquakes is an entity distinct of this club, and hosted the first ever MLS game on April 6, 1996, against D.C. United. In 2005, the then owner of the Earthquakes, Anschutz Entertainment Group, announced plans of the team relocating to Houston due to failing efforts to secure a soccer-specific stadium in San Jose. The organization in Houston would be considered an expansion team by the league, eventually being known as the Houston Dynamo, who began play in 2006. The Earthquakes returned after a two-year hiatus, resuming play in 2008.

, a total of 210 players have participated in at least one league match for the San Jose Earthquakes. Chris Wondolowski is the MLS all-time top scorer with 171 goals as well as the San Jose Earthquakes club all-time top scorer with 171 goals. Shea Salinas has the most assists for the club with 50. A total of 106 Earthquakes players have represented their country at full international level. Landon Donovan has made the most international appearances (157 for the United States), and scored the most goals (57).

Players
Major League Soccer clubs are allowed a roster of 28 players at any one time during the MLS season. Players who were contracted to the club but never played an MLS game are not listed.

All statistics are for the MLS regular season games only, and are correct .

Key

DF = Defender

MF = Midfielder

FW = Forward/striker

Int. caps = International appearances

Int. goals = International goals

Outfield players

Goalkeepers

The San Jose Earthquakes' most used goalkeeper all-time is Joe Cannon, who helped lead San Jose to their first MLS Cup in 2001 and won MLS Goalkeeper of the Year in 2002. Pat Onstad took on the starting role in 2003 after Cannon left the Earthquakes, leading the team to their second ever MLS Cup in 2003 and first ever Supporters' Shield in 2005, winning MLS Goalkeeper of the Year in both respective seasons. When the Earthquakes franchise was restarted in 2008, Cannon was the starting goalkeeper once again. Jon Busch became San Jose's starting goalkeeper in 2010, leading San Jose to playoff appearances in 2010 and 2012 as well as the club's second Supporters' Shield in the latter season. Long time backup David Bingham became the team's starting goalkeeper in 2015 and has since earned his first international caps for the United States as well as his first MLS All-Star appearance in 2016.

By nationality

MLS regulations permit teams to name eight players from outside of the United States in their rosters. However, this limit can be exceeded by trading international slots with another MLS team, or if one or more of the overseas players is a refugee or has permanent residency rights in the USA. , ninety-nine players from outside the United States have played in MLS for the San Jose Earthquakes.

Notes

References

San Jose Earthquakes
 
San Jose Earthquakes players
San Jose Earthquakes players